Carex acaulis, known as the small dusky sedge, is a species of sedge in the genus Carex native to the Falkland Islands and southern Argentina.

Description

Taxonomy and distribution
Carex acaulis was first described by Jules Dumont d'Urville in 1826. He based his description on type material from near Port Louis on East Falkland Island. The holotype was deposited at the Muséum national d'Histoire naturelle in Paris. The species has subsequently been reported from Patagonia and Tierra del Fuego in Argentina, although the Fuegian reports are considered suspect by the sedge expert Gerald Allen Wheeler; many of them actually refer to specimens of Carex sagei.

Conservation and ecology
Like many other sedges, Carex acaulis is restricted to wet habitats, such as bogs and lake margins. It is not included on the IUCN Red List, but it is rare in the Falkland Islands, and is listed nationally as a vulnerable species.

References

External links
 – includes images of the holotype

acaulis
Flora of southern South America
Flora of the Falkland Islands
Plants described in 1825